Hinche is a commune in the Centre department Haiti. It has a population of about 50,000. It is the capital of the Centre department. Hinche is the hometown of Charlemagne Péralte, the Haitian nationalist leader who resisted the United States occupation of Haiti that lasted between 1915–1934.

History

Colonial era 

The island of Hispaniola was discovered by the navigator Christopher Columbus in 1492. The original population of the island, the Tainos, were gradually destroyed by the Spanish conquistadors.

The village of Hincha was founded in 1704, by Spanish settlers from the Canary Islands.

In 1739 its population was of 500 colonists, in 1760 its population reached 3,092 people, of whom 1,443 were slaves; in 1783 its population dropped to 2,993, this decline is explained by the founding of San Rafael de La Angostura and San Miguel de la Atalaya, these cities, located in the Central Plateau, along with San Francisco de Bánica and Dajabón then totaled 18,000 inhabitants (14% of the Spanish colony's population).

Its economy was primarily focused on the export of beef to the incipient French colony of Saint-Domingue, where the meat was 750% more expensive. In 1743 it had 19,335 livestock (the second largest in the Spanish colony), and in 1772 the number of livestock rose to 30,000 head, the largest one in the colony.

In 1776, the governors of Saint-Domingue and Santo Domingo agreed in San Miguel de la Atalaya to the creation of a joint commission that would draw the border between the two colonies. The following year, Spain and France signed the Treaty of Aranjuez (1777), and the border between the Spanish and French colonies was plotted.

Hincha was the scene of armed conflict during the War of the First Coalition. At the end of this war, Spain was to yield to France under the Peace of Basel, their rights over all the Hispaniola island in exchange for the regions of the Basque Country, Navarre, Catalonia and Valencia, occupied by France during the war. However France did not take possession of the Spanish colony under the treaty until 1802. In 1801, amid the Haitian Revolution, Toussaint Louverture captured Santo Domingo and proclaimed the emancipation of the slaves. The next year, Napoleon Bonaparte sent an army commanded by his brother-in-law, General Charles Leclerc, who captured L’Ouverture and sent him to France as prisoner. In 1809, during the course of the Napoleonic Wars, Spain regained its former possessions on the island and slavery was restored.

From 1821 to 1937 

On 1 December 1821 it was declared in Santo Domingo the independence of the Republic of Spanish Haiti by the European-born and Criollo white colonial aristocracy, but this action was not supported by the population with any degree of African descent (including many slaves and servants who were phenotypically white), who were wary of the rule of pure whites, and preferred to unite with the French Haiti, because there was no slavery. On late 1821 and early 1822, Haiti sent emissaries to the central and northern Spanish Haiti to promote the accession of the country to Haiti, and the people began to raise the Haitian flag on public buildings and plazas, among them Hincha, but also in another large cities like Puerto Plata (13 December 1821), Dajabón (15 December), Santiago (29 December) and La Vega (4 January 1822). The Haitian government proceed to annex the Eastern side of the island in February 1822 and the Haitian army entered in Santo Domingo city with no resistance on 1 March 1822, commanded by President Jean-Pierre Boyer. After political and economic crises and growing discontent, most people felt cheated. In 1844 the former Spanish Haiti declared its independence and became the Dominican Republic.

Neighboring towns and cities like Hincha (now Hinche), Juana Méndez (now Ouanaminthe), San Rafael de La Angostura (now Saint-Raphaël), San Miguel de la Atalaya (now Saint-Michel-de-l’Atalaye), or Las Caobas (now Lascahobas), among others, remained isolated with little communication with the Dominican capital whilst there were a growing Haitian influence as the gourde circulated and in addition to the Spanish language, Haitian Creole was also spoken. Eventually these cities would be disputed between the two countries.

Hinche is the native town of Pedro Santana, first President of the Dominican Republic, as well of José de Guzmán, 1st Viscount of San Rafael de la Angostura, and Charlemagne Péralte, Haitian nationalist leader of Dominican origin who resisted the occupation of Haiti by the United States (1915–1934).

Recent history 

On 18 March 2016, at least 7 people were killed and 30 injured in Henche when a fuel truck exploded while delivering fuel to a Total station in the city. Four homes and 22 vehicles were also destroyed in the accident.

Culture
The majority of the population are of African descent with a minority having Dominican ancestry.
The official religion is Roman Catholicism, but the constitution allows the free choice of religion. There are also many non-Catholic Christian churches in the city and the surrounding communities. Groups, like the Haiti Endowment Fund (HEF) of Southern California send medical missionaries several times a year to provide medicines and basic healthcare. HEF has also helped build community churches. Some of the people also practice vodou.

Cuisine

The cuisine is Créole, French, or a mixture of both. Créole cuisine is like other Caribbean cuisines, but more peppery. Specialties include griot (deep-fried pieces of pork), lambi (conch, considered an aphrodisiac), tassot (jerked beef) and rice with djon-djon (tiny, dark mushrooms). As elsewhere in the Caribbean, lobster is well known here. A wide range of microclimates produces a large assortment of fruits and vegetables. Vegetarians will have a difficult time here, because pig fat is often used in food preparation, so even beans are to be avoided.

The people enjoy a strong, sweet coffee—Rebo is one brand. The Barbancourt rum is also popular.

Interesting cuisine-related features of Hinche, include a market and the "Foyer d’Accueil", an unmarked guesthouse above a school that is behind a blue and white church on the eastside of the main square.

Post-earthquake difficulties 

In the wake of 12 January 2010, while no casualties or serious damage were reported in Hinche, thousands of refugees began pouring into the town.

Attractions

Hinche can be accessed by road or plane. It has one of the major Haitian airports which has a dirt runway that will allow a small Cessna and single engine planes to land. Usually, these flights are chartered from Port-au-Prince. Mission Aviation Fellowship offers charter flights to Hinche.  East of Hinche, Bassin Zim is a 20 m waterfall in a lush setting, a 30-minute drive from town. In the city you will also find the Cathédrale de Sacré-Coeur.

Transportation

Route Nationale 3, the 128-km semi-dirt road northeast from Port-au-Prince to Hinche requires a four-wheel drive and takes at least two hours (much longer by public transport).  100 percent of this road is now paved.  It starts by crossing the Cul-de-Sac plain via Croix-des-Bouquets. Here, Route Nationale 8, a newly improved road, branches off southeast through a parched, barren region, skirting Lake Saumâtre before reaching the Dominican border at Malpasse. Mission Aviation Fellowship charters flights to the airport in town Hinche Airport.  Before a flight comes in livestock and people must be cleared from the airstrip.  The airport is located right near center city and right across the street is the hospital. The RN3 heads north out of Mirebalais on to the Central Plateau, where the military crackdown was especially harsh after the 1991 coup because peasant movements had been pressing for change here for years. After skirting the Peligre Hydroelectric Dam, now silted up and almost useless, the road passes Thomonde and reaches this city.

Media

Radio
Radio Seven Stars
Radio Super Continentale
Radyo Leve Kanpe
Radyo Vwa Peyizan
Radio Quotidien FM
Radio Immaculée Conceptio
Radio Centre Inter
Radio CAST FM
Radio Communautaire de Pandiassou
Radio MEN FM
Le Prince FM
Radio Africa

Television
Télé Quotidien
Tele Pam
Tele Super Continentale
Tele Seven Stars
Tele Leve Kanpe
Tele MEN

References

External links
Travel Video Tour of Hinche
Hinche Cholera Hospital

 
Populated places in Centre (department)
Communes of Haiti
Populated places established in 1704
1704 establishments in the Spanish Empire